Birch (bark) tar or birch pitch is a substance (liquid when heated) derived from the dry distillation of the bark of the birch tree.

Chemical composition 
Birch tar/pitch is mainly composed of triterpenoid compounds of the lupane and oleanane family, which can be used as biomarkers to identify birch tar in the archaeological record. The most characteristic molecules are betulin and lupeol which are also present in birch bark. Some of these molecules degrade into other lupane and oleanane skeleton triperpenes. The most commonly found additional molecules are lupenone, betulone, lupa-2,20(29)-dien-28-ol, lupa-2,20(29)-diene and allobetulin.

Ancient and modern uses 
Birch tar was used widely as an adhesive as early as the Middle Paleolithic to early Mesolithic era. Neanderthals produced tar through the dry distillation of birch bark as early as 200,000 years ago. A study from 2019 showed that birch tar production can be a very simple process, merely involving the burning of birch bark near smooth vertical surfaces in open air conditions. A rare find from the Dutch North Sea shows that Neanderthals used birch bark tar as a backing on small 'domestic' stone tools. 

Birch tar also has been used as a disinfectant, in leather dressing, and in medicine.

A piece of 5,000-year-old chewing gum made from birch bark tar and still bearing tooth imprints, has been found in Kierikki in Finland. Genetic material retained in the gum has enabled novel research regarding population movements, the types of foods consumed, and the types of bacteria found on their teeth.

A different chewing gum sample, dated to 5,700 years old, was found in southern Denmark. A complete human genome and oral microbiome was sequenced from the chewed birch pitch. Researchers identified that the individual who chewed the pitch was a female closely related genetically to hunter-gatherers from mainland Europe.

Ends of fletching of arrows were fastened with birch-tar and birch-tar-and-rawhide lashings were used to fix the blade of axes in the Mesolithic period.

Birch tar was more frequently discovered in archaeological contexts dating from the Neolithic to the Iron Age. For example, birch tar was identified to serve as an adhesive to repair and decorate/paint ceramic vessels, as a sealing/waterproofing agent. A well-known example of birch tar hafting during the copper age is Ötzi’s hafted arrow points and copper axe. Multiple discoveries show that birch tar was also used to assemble metal artefacts, such as pendants and other ornaments, on both a functional and decorative level. During the Roman Era, birch tar is mostly replaced by wood tar, but birch tar is still used, for example, to decorate hinges and other bone objects.

Russia leather is a water-resistant leather, oiled with birch oil after tanning. This leather was a major export good from seventeenth- and eighteenth-century Russia, as the availability of birch oil limited its geographical production. The oil impregnation also deterred insect attack and gave a distinctive and pleasant aroma that was seen as a mark of quality in leather.

Birch tar is also one of the components of Vishnevsky liniment.

Birch tar oil is an effective repellent of gastropods. The repellent effect lasts about two weeks. The repellent effect of birch tar oil mixed with petroleum jelly applied to a fence lasts up to several months. 

Birch tar oil has strong antiseptic properties owing to a large amount of phenol derivatives and terpenoid derivatives.

Birch tar oil was used in the eighteenth century alongside civet and castoreum and many other aromatic substances to scent the fine Spanish leather Peau d'Espagne. At the turn of the twentieth century, birch tar has become a specialty fragrance material in perfumery as a base note to impart a leathery, smoky note in fragrances, especially from the leather and tobacco genre, and to a lesser extent in Chypres, especially Cuir de Russie perfumes and fragrance bases, typically together with castoreum and isobutyl quinoline. It is used as an ingredient in some soaps, i.e. the scent of Imperial Leather soap, though other tars (i.e. from pine, coal) with an equally phenolic and smoky odour are more commonly used in soaps as a medicating agent.

References

External links 
 Non-video demonstration
Treating Leather With Birch Tar

Adhesives
Non-timber forest products